The BMW N62 is a naturally aspirated V8 petrol engine which was used in BMW cars from 2001–2010. It also remained in small-scale production for the Morgan Aero until 2019. The N62 is the world's first engine to use a continuously variable-length intake manifold, and BMW's first V8 to feature variable valve lift (called Valvetronic). 

Unlike its predecessor and successor, there was no M version of the N62.

In the International Engine of the Year awards in 2002, the N62 was awarded "International Engine of the Year", "Best New Engine" and "Above 4-litre" categories.

Design 
The N62 was a clean sheet design and not a direct evolution of the M60 engine line that evolved into the M62 engine. As per the M62, the N62 has double overhead camshafts (DOHC) with four valves per cylinder, an aluminium engine block, an aluminium cylinder head and offset fracture-split forged powdered metal connecting rods. It was also the first V8 and only the second BMW engine to feature Valvetronic technology which on the N62 varies the valve lift of the engine from .03mm to 9.85mm. The redline is 6500 rpm. Valvetronic technology allows for variable valve timing, variable lift and variable duration and the N62 adjusts the lift instead of utilizing the throttle body during normal operation. The engine does feature a throttle body but this is only used for emergency applications in the event of Valvetronic failure and for certain cold start conditions. A vacuum pump is mounted to cylinder bank 1 to supply vacuum for the brake booster and secondary air injection ports.

The N62B44 is the only production engine in the world to feature a continuously variable length intake manifold known as the DIVA intake (not to be confused with the DISA intake as used on many other BMW production engines). The intake length path begins to shorten at 3,500 and is progressively shortened until it reaches it's shortest length at the engine's redline. 

Applications:
 2004-2005 BMW 5 Series (E60) 545i
 2004-2005 BMW 6 Series (E63) 645Ci
 2001-2004 BMW 7 Series (E65) 745i/745Li
 2004-2006 BMW X5 (E53) X5 4.4i

The N62B48 engine used in the E53 X5 4.8is was a 4.8L variant of the N62B44 which still utilized many features of the N62B44 such as the DIVA intake manifold.

The N62B44 was evolved into the N62B48TU beginning in model year 2005. Several changes were made to the engine including different exhaust manifolds, replacement of the DIVA continuously variable length intake manifold to a DISA two-stage manifold, removal of secondary air injection ports and several small changes to accommodate the longer stroke crankshaft such as more traditional non-offset connecting rods and a deeper oil pan. It also featured different spark plugs, oxygen sensors, engine computer and inlet and exhaust valves with a stem diameter decreased to 5mm from 6mm. 

Applications:
 2005-2010 BMW 5 Series (E60) 550i
 2005-2010 BMW 6 Series (E63) 650i
 2005-2008 BMW 7 Series (E65) 750i/750Li
 2007-2010 BMW X5 (E70) X5 4.8i

Versions

N62B36
The N62B36 is a  version.

Applications:
 2001-2005 E65/E66 735i/735Li

N62B40
The N62B40 is a  version.

Applications:
 2005-2010 E60/E61 540i sedan and touring
 2005-2008 E65/E66 740i/740Li sedan

N62B44
The N62B44 is a  version. (except for in the X5 model).

Applications:
 2001-2005 E65/E66 745i/745Li
 2003-2005 E60/E61 545i
 2003-2007 E63/E64 645Ci
 2005-2007 Morgan Aero 8 Series 2 and Series 3

N62B48

Applications- 261 kW version:
 2007–2010 E70 X5 4.8i SAV

Applications- 265 kW version:
 2003–2011 Wiesmann GT MF4 / Roadster MF4
 2004-2006 E53 X5 4.8iS SAV

Applications- 270 kW version:
 2005-2010 E60/E61 550i sedan and touring
 2005–2010 E63/E64 650i coupé and convertible
 2005-2008 E65/E66 750i/750Li
 2008–2010 Morgan Aero 8 Series 4, Series 5, Aeromax, and Aero Coupe
 2010–2015 Morgan Aero SuperSports

Alpina H1 
The H1 is a version of the N62B44 made by Alpina. The H1 is based on an N62B44 block with a forged crankshaft from Alpina, high strength Mahle pistons and the addition of an ASA centrifugal supercharger.

Applications- 368 kW
 2005-2007 in the Alpina B5 (E60/E61)
 2006-2007 in the Alpina B6 (E63)
 2003-2008 in the Alpina B7 (E65)
Applications- 390 kW
 2007-2010 in the Alpina B5 S (E60/E61)
 2007-2010 in the Alpina B6 S (E63)

See also
 List of BMW engines

References

N62
V8 engines
Gasoline engines by model